One third of Broxbourne Borough Council in Hertfordshire, England is elected each year, followed by one year without election. Since the last boundary changes in 2012, 30 councillors are elected from 10 wards.

The 2012 election was a whole council election and the usual arrangement of election by thirds is scheduled to resume sometime in 2014.

Political control

Leadership
The leaders of the council since 2005 have been:

Council elections
1973 Broxbourne Borough Council election
1976 Broxbourne Borough Council election (New ward boundaries increased the number of wards by 1 and seats by 2)
1978 Broxbourne Borough Council election
1979 Broxbourne Borough Council election
1980 Broxbourne Borough Council election
1982 Broxbourne Borough Council election
1983 Broxbourne Borough Council election
1984 Broxbourne Borough Council election
1986 Broxbourne Borough Council election
1987 Broxbourne Borough Council election
1988 Broxbourne Borough Council election
1990 Broxbourne Borough Council election
1991 Broxbourne Borough Council election
1992 Broxbourne Borough Council election
1994 Broxbourne Borough Council election (Borough boundary changes took place but the number of seats remained the same)
1995 Broxbourne Borough Council election
1996 Broxbourne Borough Council election
1998 Broxbourne Borough Council election
1999 Broxbourne Borough Council election (New ward boundaries reduced the number of wards by 1 and seats by 4)
2000 Broxbourne Borough Council election
2002 Broxbourne Borough Council election
2003 Broxbourne Borough Council election
2004 Broxbourne Borough Council election
2006 Broxbourne Borough Council election
2007 Broxbourne Borough Council election
2008 Broxbourne Borough Council election
2010 Broxbourne Borough Council election
2011 Broxbourne Borough Council election
2012 Broxbourne Borough Council election (New ward boundaries reduced the number of wards by 3 and seats by 8)
2014 Broxbourne Borough Council election
2015 Broxbourne Borough Council election
2016 Broxbourne Borough Council election
2018 Broxbourne Borough Council election
2019 Broxbourne Borough Council election
2021 Broxbourne Borough Council election

Political balance of the council

By-election results

References

External links
Broxbourne Borough Council
Local Government Boundary Commission for England

 
District council elections in England
Local elections
Council elections in Hertfordshire